St. Mary's Roman Catholic Church, also known as Old St. Mary's, is a historic church in Philadelphia, Pennsylvania. It is located in the Society Hill neighborhood at 248 S. Fourth Street, between Spruce and Walnut Streets.

Commonly referred to as "Old Saint Mary's", it opened in 1763 and was the second Catholic church in Philadelphia after St. Joseph's. It is still an active parish of the Archdiocese of Philadelphia, with Masses held on Saturdays at 4:30 p.m. and Sunday at 10 a.m. The current pastor is Paul A. DiGirolamo, J.C.D.  The church is twinned with Holy Trinity Church at 6th and Spruce Streets, which serves as a worship site of St. Mary and which has Masses on holy days at 12 noon.

History

Old Saint Mary's was established as a more spacious worship site for Old Saint Joseph's church, a block away.  Old Saint Joseph's had started as a chapel in a residence because public celebration of Catholic Mass was illegal at the time. In 1757, a larger church was built on the site of Old Saint Joseph's in Willings Alley; but six years later, Old St. Mary's was erected on a site which included room for a Catholic cemetery.  St. Mary's and Old St. Joseph's remained a single parish until 1830.  It was at St. Mary's, in 1782, that the first parish school connected to a Catholic church in America was opened.   An interparochial school remains connected with the parish to this day.

Members of the Continental Congress and other public figures attended services on occasion at the church, since it was the city's most prominent Catholic church at the time.  Among them were George Washington and John Adams, who observed that the visual and musical splendor of the church encompassed "everything that can lay hold of eye, ear, and imagination, everywhere which can charm and bewitch the simple and ignorant," adding, "I wonder how Luther ever broke the spell."

In 1810, after Philadelphia had been made a diocese, St. Mary's was named the cathedral, a role in which it continued until 1838, when St. John the Evangelist Church superseded it.

Under the first three bishops of the diocese, the trustees of St. Mary's were frequently at odds with the bishops; the disputes finally culminated in the temporary closure of the church in 1831 by Bishop Francis Patrick Kenrick, after which the disputes finally subsided.

Interior and architecture
The church was renovated in 1963, but many of the earlier features were retained, including an 18th-century baptismal font and the cathedra of Bishop Conwell from 1820, when the church served as the diocesan cathedral.  Chandeliers which were originally installed in Independence Hall have also been kept in the renovated building. The façade is of brick in the Gothic style and the interior of the church features a balcony/choir loft which extends around three sides of the building, to either side of the altar in the front. Above the main door, on the exterior wall, in an alcove, is a statue of Mary, after whom the parish is named. Similarly, the ceiling features a fresco of Mary's Assumption and stained glass windows, some reaching a height of two stories.   The original architect was Charles Johnson.

Education
The church's designated parochial grade school is St. Mary Interparochial Grade School.

Cemetery

The churchyard dates from 1759. Its cemetery was enlarged (by adding an extra layer of soil to the ground level) after the Yellow Fever Epidemic of 1793.

Notable interments
Commodore John Barry (1745–1803), father of the American navy
 Michael Bouvier (1792–1874), cabinetmaker and great-great-grandfather of Jacqueline Kennedy-Onassis
James Campbell (1812–1893), Postmaster General of the United States
Jean Joseph de Barth (1726–1793), Alsatian counselor to Louis XVI of France who led refugees from the French Revolution to America
Mathew Carey (1760–1839), publisher and pamphleteer
Thomas Fitzsimons (1741–1811), Continental Congressman
George Meade (1741–1808), merchant and grandfather of General George Gordon Meade
Richard Worsam Meade I (1778–1828), merchant and father of General Meade
Richard Worsam Meade II (1807–1870), Navy captain
Stephen Moylan (1737–1811), military commander in the American Revolutionary War
Manuel Torres (1762–1822), first Colombian ambassador to the United States
Philippe Charles Tronson du Coudray (1738–1777), French army officer who volunteered his services to the Continental Army

The center of the grave yard collapsed circa 1965 as witnessed by the lawn gardener after a rain. This is based on an eyewitness acct of the teenager who cut the grass,

See also

List of Catholic cathedrals in the United States
List of cathedrals in the United States

References

External links

 - Old St. Mary Church & Holy Trinity Church
Saint Mary Interparochial School
Article at USHistory.org
Saint Mary's Catholic Churchyard at Find a Grave

18th-century Roman Catholic church buildings in the United States
Roman Catholic churches in Philadelphia
Former cathedrals in the United States
Roman Catholic churches completed in 1763
Roman Catholic cathedrals in Pennsylvania
Society Hill, Philadelphia
1763 establishments in Pennsylvania